Tollett is a surname. It may refer to the following notable people:

 Dave Tollett (born 1966), American college baseball coach
 Leland Tollett, American businessman
 Richard Tollett, 16th-century English clergyman
 Tulsen Tollett (born 1973), British rugby player and TV presenter